Challeru is a village in Rowthulapudi Mandal, Kakinada district in the state of Andhra Pradesh in India.

Geography 

Demographics 
 India census, Challeru had a population of 52, out of which 29 were male and 23 were female. Population of children below 6 years of age were 7. The literacy rate of the village is 20.00%.

References 

Villages in Rowthulapudi mandal